Giannis Boutsakis (born 8 February 1994) is a Greek professional footballer who plays as a midfielder for Super League 2 club Chania.

Career

Atsalenios
Born in Heraklion, Boutsakis began playing football at the age of 7, when his parents signed him up at the infrastructure segments of local club Atsalenios. He was promoted to the senior squad in 2012, and stayed with the club until the summer of 2017, when he was transferred to Second Division club Ergotelis.

Ergotelis
Boutsakis made his professional debut for Ergotelis as a starter in the club's first match of the season during a 2−0 Cup loss against Panserraikos on 18 September 2017. He kept his place as a regular starter throughout the duration of the season, and was called up by the club's administration to sign a new three-year contract in June 2018.

Career statistics

Personal life
In 2018, Boutsakis obtained a degree from the Department of Preschool Education of the University of Crete, for which he received an honorary award during the 2018 Greek football PSAP awards.

References

External links

1994 births
Living people
Gamma Ethniki players
Football League (Greece) players
Super League Greece 2 players
Ergotelis F.C. players
Association football midfielders
Footballers from Heraklion
Greek footballers